Şevketiye can refer to:

 Şevketiye, Aydın
 Şevketiye, Kestel
 Şevketiye, Lapseki